The Kelso Depot, Restaurant and Employees Hotel or Kelso Depot, now also the Mojave National Preserve Visitors Center, is located in the Mojave Desert within the National Park Service Mojave National Preserve, on Kelso Cima Road at the junction of Kelbaker Road in Kelso, California, between Baker and Interstate 15 to the north and Interstate 40 to the south. It was placed on the National Register of Historic Places, and along with the adjacent ghost town of Kelso, was declared a United States Historic District in 2000.  The district was increased by a boundary increase approved by the National Park Service in 2019, with reference number 100003401.

History

Early years

The first depot, by the Los Angeles and Salt Lake Railroad, opened in 1905. In early 1923 the railroad began construction of the new "Kelso Clubhouse & Restaurant" which opened the next year. The Kelso Depot was built to provide services to passengers and railroad employees, and a water stop for the steam locomotives. It is an example of a surviving mid-1920s era Mission Revival and Spanish Colonial Revival architecture Styled railroad depot with a hotel, restaurant, and gardens in Southern California. It was designed by the firm of John and Donald Parkinson.  The facility served interstate passenger and shipping traffic and the transport of ore from local mines, especially the Vulcan Mine. It was an essential element of the 1920s modernization of the Union Pacific Railroad stations to compete with the Santa Fe Railway and its Harvey Houses such as "Casa del Desierto".

The oasis-like landscape design and overall style and character of this remote station made it a popular gathering place for Union Pacific employees, passengers and local residents. The original gardens with shade from Fremont cottonwoods (Populus fremontii), Chinese elms (Ulmus parvifolia), and manicured geometric lawns lingered, but did not survive the desert conditions between depot closure and the park's Visitor Center restoration. Only date palms (Phoenix dactylifera) survived.

Mid-20th century

The Kelso Depot served as a significant element in the Union Pacific's contributions to the American war effort during World War II. The end of World War II marked the beginning of a long decline in the depot's utility. The sharp decline in the volume of freight traffic and diesel engines replacing steam caused a reduction in services and the need for fewer employees. The Vulcan Mine closed early in 1947, further reducing freight and passenger traffic. A surge of activity occurred with the outbreak of the Korean War in the early 1950s, resulting in a renewal of high traffic levels on the Union Pacific line for several years.

In 1953 and 1957, attempts were made to market the low-grade iron ore stockpiled at the Vulcan Mine. However, higher horse power, second generation diesel-electric locomotives of the 1960s resulted in the further decline in Union Pacific personnel needed at Kelso. This technological change eliminated the need for helper locomotives entirely in 1959. Coupled with the closing of the station agency and cessation of passenger train service to Kelso on August 14, 1964, this development spelled the end of the depot's principal function with the exception of the Lunch Room which remained serving until 1985.

Restoration and Visitor Center

The Union Pacific proposed the demolition of the then unused depot in 1985. Efforts to preserve the building culminated in its 1992 transfer to the Bureau of Land Management and its East Mojave National Scenic Area.

In 1994 the Mojave National Preserve was established, and the depot was transferred to the National Park Service. A historical restoration and adaptive reuse project followed in 2002. The Kelso Depot now serves, since 2005, as the main Visitor Center of the Mojave National Preserve.

See also 
 Cima Dome & Volcanic Field National Natural Landmark
 El Garces Hotel – Needles, California
 Harvey House Railroad Depot – Barstow, California
 Western America Railroad Museum
 Kelso Dunes
 Kelso Mountains
 Lavic Lake volcanic field
 Pisgah Crater

References

External links

NPS—Mojave National Preserve: Kelso Depot—history and photos
Kelso Depot floor plan and virtual model
Official Mojave National Preserve website — homepage.

Mojave National Preserve
Museums in San Bernardino County, California
Railroad museums in California
Railway hotels in the United States
Railway stations in San Bernardino County, California
Los Angeles and Salt Lake Railroad
Former Union Pacific Railroad stations in California
Historic American Buildings Survey in California
History of the Mojave Desert region
History of San Bernardino County, California
Hotel buildings completed in 1924
Historic district contributing properties in California
National Register of Historic Places in San Bernardino County, California
Railway stations on the National Register of Historic Places in California
Railway stations in the United States opened in 1905
Railway stations closed in 1964
Protected areas of the Mojave Desert
John and Donald Parkinson buildings
Mission Revival architecture in California
Spanish Colonial Revival architecture in California
Historic districts on the National Register of Historic Places in California